The following is a list of notable events and releases of the year 2018 in Icelandic music.

Events

February

March 
 3 – The artist and song for Iceland in the Eurovision Song Contest 2018 is decided. Ari Ólafsson wins, with the song "Heim".
 16 – The 6th Sonar Reykjavik festival start (March 16 – 17).

April

May

June

July 
 4 – The 19th Folk music festival of Siglufjordur start in Siglufjordur (July 4 – 8).
 11 – The 14th Eistnaflug festival start in Neskaupstaður (July 11–14).

August

September

October

November 
 7 – The Iceland Airwaves music festival opens, running until 10 November. Guests include Blood_Orange, Cashmere Cat and Stella Donnelly.

December

Deaths

 February
 9 – Jóhann Jóhannsson, film composer, The Theory of Everything, Arrival, Sicario (born 1969).
 August
 21 – Stefán Karl Stefánsson, singer, LazyTown (born 1975).

See also 
 2018 in Iceland
 Music of Iceland
 Iceland in the Eurovision Song Contest 2018

References

Icelandic music
Icelandic
2018 in Iceland